The 2014 season was Club de Regatas Vasco da Gama's 116th year in existence, the club's 99th season in existence of football, and the club's 2nd season playing in the Brasileirão Série B, the second tier of Brazilian football.

After finishing the 2013 season in 5th place in Brasileirão Série A, Vasco da Gama suffered its second relegation in five years on an administration of, until then, the greatest idol of the club, Roberto Dinamite. Vasco da Gama aimed to return to the top division and win its 2nd title of the Brazilian Série B. The club was also be competing the 2014 Copa do Brasil, a competition which it won in 2011.

Players

Current squad

Youth players who are able to play in first team

Reserve players (Vasco da Gama B)

Out on loan

Squad information 
As of 10 February 2014.

Youth players who are able to play in first team 

As of 10 February 2014.

Reserve players (Vasco da Gama B)

Out on loan 

As of 10 February 2014.

Transfers summary

In

Loan In

On Trial (In)

Out

Loan Out



Match results

Copa São Paulo Júnior (U-20)

Copa São Paulo squad

Group stage (Group T)

Table standings

Matches

Rio de Janeiro State Championship

Guanabara Cup

Table standings

Matches

Semifinals

Matches

Finals

Matches

Copa do Brasil

First round

Matches

Second round

Matches

Third round

Matches

Round of 16

Matches

Brasileirão Série B

Standings

Results by round

Match results

Squad statistics

Appearances and goals 
Last updated on 29 November 2014.
 Players in italic have left the club during the season.

|-
|colspan="14"|Youth academy's players who participated during the season: (Statistics shown are the appearances made and goals scored while at Vasco da Gama first squad)

|-
|colspan="14"|Players who left the club during the season: (Statistics shown are the appearances made and goals scored while at Vasco da Gama)

|}

Goalkeeper statistics 

{| border="1" cellpadding="4" cellspacing="0" style="margin: 1em 1em 1em 1em 0; background: #f9f9f9; border: 1px #aaa solid; border-collapse: collapse; font-size: 95%; text-align: center;"
|-
| rowspan="2" style="width:1%; text-align:center;"  |No.
| rowspan="2" style="width:70px; text-align:center;"|Nat.
| rowspan="2" style="width:40.5%; text-align:center;" |Player
| colspan="3" style="text-align:center;"|Total
| colspan="3" style="text-align:center;"|Brasileirão Série B
| colspan="3" style="text-align:center;"|Copa do Brasil
| colspan="3" style="text-align:center;"|Rio de Janeiro State Championship
|-
|PLD
|GA
|GAA
|PLD
|GA
|GAA
|PLD
|GA
|GAA
|PLD
|GA
|GAA
|-
| style="text-align: right;" |1
|
| style="text-align: left;" |Martín Silva
|45
|39
|0.86
|25
|26
|1.04
|5
|3
|0.60
|15
|10
|0.67
|-
| style="text-align: right;" |25
|
| style="text-align: left;" |Diogo Silva
|16
|15
|0.93
|9
|9
|1.00
|3
|3
|1.00
|4
|3
|0.75
|-
| style="text-align: right;" |40
|
| style="text-align: left;" |Jordi
|4
|1
|0.25
|4
|1
|0.25
|0
|0
|0.00
|0
|0
|0.00
|-
| style="text-align: right;" |44
|
| style="text-align: left;" |Rafael Copetti
|0
|0
|0.00
|0
|0
|0.00
|0
|0
|0.00
|0
|0
|0.00

Italic: denotes player is no longer with team

Top scorers 

{| class="wikitable" style="font-size: 95%; text-align: center;"
|-
!width=15 style="background:#000000; color:white; text-align:center;"|
!width=15 style="background:#000000; color:white; text-align:center;"|
!width=15 style="background:#000000; color:white; text-align:center;"|
!width=15 style="background:#000000; color:white; text-align:center;"|
!width=226 style="background:#000000; color:white; text-align:center;"|Name
!width=130 style="background:#000000; color:white; text-align:center;"|Brasileirão Série B
!width=110 style="background:#000000; color:white; text-align:center;"|Copa do Brasil
!width=150 style="background:#000000; color:white; text-align:center;"|Rio de Janeiro State Championship
!width=80 style="background:#000000; color:white; text-align:center;"|Total
|-
|rowspan=2|1
|7
|FW
|
|Edmílson
|3
|0
|11
|14
|-
|10
|MF
|
|Douglas
|10
|2
|2
|14
|-
|3
|39
|FW
|
|Thalles
|3
|3
|4
|10
|-
|rowspan=2|4
|30
|FW
|
|Kléber
|5
|1
|0
|6
|-
|35
|DF
|
|Douglas Silva
|5
|1
|0
|6
|-
|6
|3
|DF
|
|Rodrigo
|4
|0
|1
|5
|-
|rowspan=2|7
|16
|DF
|
|Marlon
|2
|0
|2
|4
|-
|20
|MF
|
|Dakson
|4
|0
|0
|4
|-
|rowspan=4|9
|11
|MF
|
|Santiago Montoya
|1
|0
|2
|3
|-
|18
|MF
|
|Maxiliano Rodríguez
|2
|1
|0
|3
|-
|23
|FW
|
|Reginaldo
|1
|0
|2
|3
|-
|31
|MF
|
|Bernardo
|0
|0
|3
|3
|-
|rowspan=4|13
|4
|DF
|
|Rafael Vaz
|0
|0
|2
|2
|-
|12
|MF
|
|Fabrício
|2
|0
|0
|2
|-
|42
|DF
|
|Carlos César
|2
|0
|0
|2
|-
|49
|MF
|
|Lucas Crispim
|2
|0
|0
|2
|-
|rowspan=10|17
|2
|DF
|
|André Rocha
|0
|0
|1
|1
|-
|6
|MF
|
|Fellipe Bastos
|0
|0
|1
|1
|-
|17
|FW
|
|Everton Costa
|0
|0
|1
|1
|-
|19
|FW
|
|William Barbio
|0
|0
|1
|1
|-
|22
|FW
|
|Rafael Silva
|1
|0
|0
|1
|-
|26
|DF
|
|Diego Renan
|0
|1
|0
|1
|-
|27
|FW
|
|Yago
|1
|0
|0
|1
|-
|29
|MF
|
|Jhon Cley
|1
|0
|0
|1
|-
|38
|MF
|
|Guilherme Biteco
|1
|0
|0
|1
|-
|
|
|
|
|0
|1
|2
|3
|-
|colspan="4"|
! style="background:#000000; color:white; text-align:center;"|TOTALS
! style="background:#000000; color:white; text-align:center;"|50
! style="background:#000000; color:white; text-align:center;"|10
! style="background:#000000; color:white; text-align:center;"|35
! style="background:#000000; color:white; text-align:center;"|94

Those in italics are no longer with club.

Top assists 

{| class="wikitable" style="font-size: 95%; text-align: center;"
|-
!width=15 style="background:#000000; color:white; text-align:center;"|
!width=15 style="background:#000000; color:white; text-align:center;"|
!width=15 style="background:#000000; color:white; text-align:center;"|
!width=15 style="background:#000000; color:white; text-align:center;"|
!width=226 style="background:#000000; color:white; text-align:center;"|Name
!width=130 style="background:#000000; color:white; text-align:center;"|Brasileirão Série B
!width=110 style="background:#000000; color:white; text-align:center;"|Copa do Brasil
!width=150 style="background:#000000; color:white; text-align:center;"|Rio de Janeiro State Championship
!width=80 style="background:#000000; color:white; text-align:center;"|Total
|-
|1
|10
|MF
|
|Douglas
|6
|3
|4
|13
|-
|2
|39
|FW
|
|Thalles
|4
|0
|2
|6
|-
|rowspan=2|3
|7
|FW
|
|Edmílson
|1
|0
|4
|5
|-
|18
|MF
|
|Maximiliano Rodríguez
|5
|0
|0
|5
|-
|5
|26
|DF
|
|Diego Renan
|1
|0
|3
|4
|-
|rowspan=3|6
|2
|DF
|
|André Rocha
|0
|0
|3
|3
|-
|16
|DF
|
|Marlon
|2
|0
|1
|3
|-
|30
|FW
|
|Kléber
|2
|1
|0
|3
|-
|rowspan=3|9
|14
|MF
|
|Eduardo Aranda
|1
|0
|1
|2
|-
|20
|MF
|
|Dakson
|1
|0
|1
|2
|-
|35
|DF
|
|Douglas Silva
|1
|1
|0
|2
|-
|rowspan=11|12
|4
|DF
|
|Rodrigo
|0
|0
|1
|1
|-
|5
|MF
|
|Pablo Guiñazú
|1
|0
|0
|1
|-
|6
|MF
|
|Fellipe Bastos
|0
|0
|1
|1
|-
|10/8
|MF
|
|Pedro Ken
|1
|0
|0
|1
|-
|12
|MF
|
|Fabrício
|1
|0
|0
|1
|-
|17
|FW
|
|Everton Costa
|0
|0
|1
|1
|-
|19
|FW
|
|William Barbio
|0
|0
|1
|1
|-
|23
|FW
|
|Reginaldo
|0
|0
|1
|1
|-
|30/23
|FW
|
|Marquinhos
|0
|1
|0
|1
|-
|31
|MF
|
|Bernardo
|0
|0
|1
|1
|-
|49
|MF
|
|Lucas Crispim
|1
|0
|0
|1
|-
|colspan="4"|
! style="background:#000000; color:white; text-align:center;"|TOTALS
! style="background:#000000; color:white; text-align:center;"|28
! style="background:#000000; color:white; text-align:center;"|6
! style="background:#000000; color:white; text-align:center;"|25
! style="background:#000000; color:white; text-align:center;"|58

Those in italics are no longer with club.

Clean sheets 
This list includes all competitive matches and is sorted by shirt number when total clean sheets are equal.

{| class="wikitable" style="font-size: 95%; text-align: center;"
|-
!width=15 style="background:#000000; color:white; text-align:center;"| 
!width=15 style="background:#000000; color:white; text-align:center;"| 
!width=15 style="background:#000000; color:white; text-align:center;"|
!width=15 style="background:#000000; color:white; text-align:center;"|
!width=226 style="background:#000000; color:white; text-align:center;"|Name
!width=130 style="background:#000000; color:white; text-align:center;"|Brasileirão Série B
!width=110 style="background:#000000; color:white; text-align:center;"|Copa do Brasil
!width=150 style="background:#000000; color:white; text-align:center;"|Rio de Janeiro State Championship
!width=80 style="background:#000000; color:white; text-align:center;"|Total
|-
|1
|1
|GK
|
|Martín Silva
|7
|2
|6
|15
|-
|2
|25
|GK
|
|Diogo Silva
|3
|1
|1
|5
|-
|3
|40
|GK
|
|Jordi
|3
|0
|0
|3
|-
|4
|44
|GK
|
|Rafael Copetti
|0
|0
|0
|0
|-
|colspan="4"|
! style="background:#000000; color:white; text-align:center;"|TOTALS
! style="background:#000000; color:white; text-align:center;"|13
! style="background:#000000; color:white; text-align:center;"|3
! style="background:#000000; color:white; text-align:center;"|7
! style="background:#000000; color:white; text-align:center;"|23

Those in italics are no longer with club.

Disciplinary record 

{| class="wikitable" style="font-size: 95%; text-align: center;"
|-
| rowspan="2"  style="width:2.5%;background:#000000; text-align:center; color:white;"|
| rowspan="2"  style="width:3%;background:#000000; text-align:center; color:white;"|
| rowspan="2"  style="width:3%;background:#000000; text-align:center; color:white;"|
| rowspan="2"  style="width:3%;background:#000000; text-align:center; color:white;"|
| rowspan="2"  style="width:15%;background:#000000; text-align:center; color:white;"|Name
| colspan="3" style="text-align:center;background:#000000; color:white;"|Brasileirão Série B
| colspan="3" style="text-align:center;background:#000000; color:white;"|Copa do Brasil
| colspan="3" style="text-align:center;background:#000000; color:white;"|Rio de Janeiro State Championship
| colspan="3" style="text-align:center;background:#000000; color:white;"|Total
|-
!  style="width:25px; background:#fe9;"|
!  style="width:28px; background:#ff8888;"|
!  style="width:25px; background:#ff8888;"|
!  style="width:25px; background:#fe9;"|
!  style="width:28px; background:#ff8888;"|
!  style="width:25px; background:#ff8888;"|
!  style="width:25px; background:#fe9;"|
!  style="width:28px; background:#ff8888;"|
!  style="width:25px; background:#ff8888;"|
!  style="width:25px; background:#fe9;"|
!  style="width:28px; background:#ff8888;"|
!  style="width:25px; background:#ff8888;"|
|-
|1
|5
|MF
|
|Pablo Guiñazú
|9
|0
|0
|1
|0
|0
|7
|0
|0
|17
|0
|0
|-
|2
|10
|MF
|
|Douglas
|8
|0
|0
|2
|0
|1
|3
|0
|0
|13
|0
|1
|-
|rowspan=4|3
|2
|DF
|
|André Rocha
|1
|0
|0
|1
|0
|0
|6
|0
|1
|8
|0
|1
|-
|11
|MF
|
|Santiago Montoya
|3
|0
|0
|4
|0
|0
|2
|0
|0
|9
|0
|0
|-
|14
|MF
|
|Eduardo Aranda
|4
|0
|0
|1
|0
|0
|4
|0
|0
|9
|0
|0
|-
|3
|DF
|
|Rodrigo
|5
|0
|0
|1
|0
|0
|3
|0
|0
|9
|0
|0
|-
|rowspan=3|7
|1
|GK
|
|Martín Silva
|4
|0
|0
|0
|0
|0
|4
|0
|0
|8
|0
|0
|-
|10/8
|MF
|
|Pedro Ken
|4
|0
|0
|0
|0
|0
|2
|1
|0
|6
|1
|0
|-
|26
|DF
|
|Diego Renan
|4
|0
|0
|2
|0
|0
|2
|0
|0
|8
|0
|0
|-
|rowspan=2|10
|12
|MF
|
|Fabrício
|5
|0
|0
|0
|1
|0
|0
|0
|0
|5
|1
|0
|-
|21
|DF
|
|Luan
|2
|0
|1
|0
|0
|0
|4
|0
|0
|6
|0
|1
|-
|rowspan=2|12
|6
|MF
|
|Fellipe Bastos
|0
|0
|0
|1
|0
|0
|5
|0
|0
|6
|0
|0
|-
|35
|DF
|
|Douglas Silva
|4
|0
|0
|2
|0
|0
|0
|0
|0
|6
|0
|0
|-
|rowspan=3|14
|16
|DF
|
|Marlon
|3
|0
|0
|0
|0
|0
|2
|0
|0
|5
|0
|0
|-
|30
|FW
|
|Kléber
|4
|0
|0
|1
|0
|0
|0
|0
|0
|5
|0
|0
|-
|39
|FW
|
|Thalles
|3
|0
|0
|0
|0
|0
|2
|0
|0
|5
|0
|0
|-
|17
|20
|MF
|
|Dakson
|4
|0
|0
|0
|0
|0
|0
|0
|0
|4
|0
|0
|-
|rowspan=2|18
|7
|FW
|
|Edmílson
|3
|0
|0
|0
|0
|0
|0
|0
|0
|3
|0
|0
|-
|31
|MF
|
|Bernardo
|0
|0
|0
|1
|0
|0
|2
|0
|0
|3
|0
|0
|-
|rowspan=6|20
|17
|FW
|
|Everton Costa
|0
|0
|0
|0
|0
|0
|0
|1
|0
|0
|1
|0
|-
|23
|FW
|
|Reginaldo
|0
|0
|0
|0
|0
|0
|2
|0
|0
|2
|0
|0
|-
|25
|GK
|
|Diogo Silva
|1
|0
|0
|1
|0
|0
|0
|0
|0
|2
|0
|0
|-
|37
|DF
|
|Henrique
|1
|0
|0
|0
|0
|0
|1
|0
|0
|2
|0
|0
|-
|38
|MF
|
|Guilherme Biteco
|2
|0
|0
|0
|0
|0
|0
|0
|0
|2
|0
|0
|-
|42
|DF
|
|Carlos César
|2
|0
|0
|0
|0
|0
|0
|0
|0
|2
|0
|0
|-
|rowspan=7|26
|4
|DF
|
|Rafael Vaz
|0
|0
|0
|1
|0
|0
|0
|0
|0
|1
|0
|0
|-
|18
|MF
|
|Danilo
|0
|0
|0
|1
|0
|0
|0
|0
|0
|1
|0
|0
|-
|19
|FW
|
|William Barbio
|0
|0
|0
|0
|0
|0
|1
|0
|0
|1
|0
|0
|-
|22
|FW
|
|Rafael Silva
|1
|0
|0
|0
|0
|0
|0
|0
|0
|1
|0
|0
|-
|28
|DF
|
|Jomar
|0
|0
|0
|0
|0
|0
|1
|0
|0
|1
|0
|0
|-
|29
|MF
|
|Jhon Cley
|1
|0
|0
|0
|0
|0
|0
|0
|0
|1
|0
|0
|-
|49
|MF
|
|Lucas Crispim
|1
|0
|0
|0
|0
|0
|0
|0
|0
|1
|0
|0
|-
|colspan="4"|
! style="background:#000000; color:white; text-align:center;"|TOTALS
! style="background:#000000; color:white; text-align:center;"|80
! style="background:#000000; color:white; text-align:center;"|0
! style="background:#000000; color:white; text-align:center;"|1
! style="background:#000000; color:white; text-align:center;"|20
! style="background:#000000; color:white; text-align:center;"|1
! style="background:#000000; color:white; text-align:center;"|1
! style="background:#000000; color:white; text-align:center;"|53
! style="background:#000000; color:white; text-align:center;"|2
! style="background:#000000; color:white; text-align:center;"|1
! style="background:#000000; color:white; text-align:center;"|153
! style="background:#000000; color:white; text-align:center;"|3
! style="background:#000000; color:white; text-align:center;"|3

Those in italics are no longer with the club.

Captains 
Accounts for all competitions. Last updated on 29 November 2014.

Starting eleven 
All competitions.

International call-ups

See also 

 2014 Rio de Janeiro State Championship
 2014 Brasileirão Série B
 2014 Copa do Brasil

References

External links
Official Site 

CR Vasco da Gama
Club de Regatas Vasco da Gama seasons
Vasco da Gama